
Gmina Sobków is a rural gmina (administrative district) in Jędrzejów County, Świętokrzyskie Voivodeship, in south-central Poland.

The gmina contains part of the protected area called Chęciny-Kielce Landscape Park.

Villages
Gmina Sobków contains the villages and settlements of Bizoręda, Brzegi, Brzeźno, Choiny, Chomentów, Jawór, Karsy, Korytnica, Lipa, Miąsowa, Mokrsko Dolne, Mokrsko Górne, Mzurowa, Niziny, Nowe Kotlice, Osowa, Sobków, Sokołów Dolny, Sokołów Górny, Staniowice, Stare Kotlice, Szczepanów, Wierzbica, Wólka Kawęcka and Żerniki.

Neighbouring gminas
Gmina Sobków is bordered by the gminas of Chęciny, Imielno, Jędrzejów, Kije, Małogoszcz and Morawica.

References
Polish official population figures 2006

Sobkow
Jędrzejów County